Entre Um Coco e Um Adeus is Adelaide Ferreira's first album.

Track listing

 Como encontrar o amor (Luís Fernando, Adelaide Ferreira, Ramón Galarza)
 Coqueirando (Carolina Maldim, Ferreira, Fernando)
 Papel principal (Tozé Brito)
 Já não sei  
 Boa ou má arte
 Dar-te o que eu não dei
 Tentação
 Foi por amar-te
 A-Deus

1989 debut albums
Adelaide Ferreira albums